Lobostemon curvifolius, the largeflower healthbush, is a species of the forget-me-not family from South Africa.

Description 
It is frequently confused with Lobostemon fruticosus. The leaves are covered in silvery hairs that lie against the surface on both the upper and lower faces. The midvein is prominent on the underside. The pointed leaf tips may curve back towards the plant. 

Flowers are present between August and November. The large (greater than ) bell-shaped flowers are borne in compound cincinni with at least three flowers per cymule. The five the sepals are oblong, similar in width and are not fused to each other. The five petals are violet-blue or pink. They are hairy on the outside. The staminal scales are ridge-like and lack lateral lobes.

Habitat and distribution 
This species is restricted to the fynbos region of the Western Cape of South Africa. It is found from Caledon and Stanford in the Overberg region to Cape Infanta.  It does not appear to be restricted to certain soil types and has been found on sandstone, limestone and sandy flats. It has been found  in a variety of fynbos habitats, including Kogelberg Sandstone Fynbos near Houw Hoek, Overberg Sandstone Fynbos between Caledon to Agulhas, Sand Fynbos near Bredasdorp, and De Hoop Limestone Fynbos and Potberg Sandstone Fynbos to the east.

References 

Boraginaceae
Biodiversity of South Africa
Plants described in 1837